Ledley is a name shared by the following people:

Joe Ledley, a Welsh footballer
Ledley King, an English footballer
Robert Ledley, a United States computer specialist.